UGC may refer to:

Science and technology
 Universal gravitational constant G, in physics
 Uppsala General Catalogue, an astronomical catalogue of galaxies
 UGC, a codon for cysteine
 Unique games conjecture, a conjecture in computational complexity

Organisations
 UGC (cinema operator), a European cinema chain, formerly Union Générale Cinématographique
 UGC Fox Distribution, a former French-American film production company formed in 1995
 Union Graduate College, Schenectady, New York
 United Grain Company, a Russian grain trading company based in Moscow
 University Grants Commission (disambiguation)
 University Grants Committee (disambiguation)
 UnitedGlobalCom, former name of the cable TV operator Liberty Global
 UnderGround Crips, an African American street gang mainly from Los Angeles, California

Other
 User-generated content, media content made by the general public
 Urine Good Company, a fictional corporation in the musical Urinetown
 Urgench International Airport, by IATA code